Delhi Capitals are a Twenty20 franchise cricket team based in Delhi, India. The team will compete in the 2022 edition. Founded in 2008 as the Delhi Daredevils, the franchise is owned by the GMR Group and the JSW Group. The team's home ground is Arun Jaitley Stadium, located in New Delhi. They will be the ten teams to compete in the 2022 Indian Premier League.

Background
Delhi Capitals retained four players ahead of the 2022 mega-auction.

Retained PlayersRishabh Pant, Axar Patel, Prithvi Shaw, Anrich Nortje
Released Shreyas Iyer, Ajinkya Rahane, Amit Mishra, Avesh Khan, Ishant Sharma, Kagiso Rabada, Ravichandran Ashwin, Shikhar Dhawan, Shimron Hetmyer, Marcus Stoinis, Lalit Yadav, Pravin Dubey, Chris Woakes, Steve Smith, Manimaran Siddharth, Tom Curran, Umesh Yadav, Lukman Meriwala, Vishnu Vinod, Ripal Patel, Sam Billings
Acquired at the auction David Warner, Mitchell Marsh, Shardul Thakur, Mustafizur Rahman, Kuldeep Yadav, Ashwin Hebbar, Sarfaraz Khan, Kamlesh Nagarkoti, KS Bharat, Mandeep Singh, Khaleel Ahmed, Chetan Sakariya, Lalit Yadav, Ripal Patel, Yash Dhull, Rovman Powell, Pravin Dubey, Lungi Ngidi, Tim Seifert, Vicky Ostwal.

Squad 
 Players with international caps are listed in bold.
Squad strength: 24 (17 - Indian, 7 - overseas)

Administration and support staff

Kit manufacturers and sponsors

|

Teams and standings

Points table

Group fixtures

References

External links
IPL team Delhi Capitals web page on official IPL T20 website - IPLT20.com
The Official Delhi Capitals Site

Cricket teams in India
2022 Indian Premier League
Delhi Capitals seasons